Tizkharab (also Romanized as Tīzkharāb and Tīzkhar Āb; also known as Tabar Kharāb and Taz Kharāb) is a village in Kenarporuzh Rural District, in the Central District of Salmas County, West Azerbaijan Province, Iran. At the time of the 2006 census, its population was 280 people, in 51 families.

References 

Populated places in Salmas County